David Chandler (June 2, 1912 – October 19, 1990) was an American screenwriter, novelist and playwright. He published a dozen novels, and wrote screenplays for feature films and TV series. He recorded and wrote the autobiography of Joe Pasternak titled Easy the Hard Way (1956), but was probably best recognized for his novel The Gangsters (1975). He was married to Isabelle Bodkin (1940–1955) and to the actress and talent agent Rita Chandler (1957–1990).

Selected works 
 Jack McCall, Desperado – 1953 film, Columbia Pictures (wrote story)
 Easy the Hard Way – 1956 autobiography of Joe Pasternak, G. P. Putnam's Sons (was ghostwriter)
 The Glass Totem – 1962 novel, Appleton-Century-Crofts
 The Ramsden Case – 1967 novel, Simon & Schuster 
 Huelga – 1970 novel, Simon & Schuster
 The Gangsters – 1975 novel, William Morrow and Company
 The Aphrodite – 1982 novel, Ballantine Books

References 
 Variety: David Chandler dead
 Imdb: David Chandler
 Abe Books: Easy the Hard Way

1912 births
1990 deaths
American male novelists
20th-century American screenwriters
20th-century American male writers